Dalibor Velimirovic (born 13 February 2001) is an Austrian professional footballer who plays as a midfielder for First Vienna.

Professional career
Velimirovic made his professional debut with SK Rapid Wien in a 3-1 Austrian Football Bundesliga win over FK Austria Wien on 1 September 2019. On 18 October 2019, Velimirovic signed his first professional contract with Rapid Wien.

References

External links
 
 
 OEFB Profile

2001 births
Austrian people of Croatian descent
Footballers from Vienna
Living people
Austrian footballers
Austria youth international footballers
Association football forwards
SK Rapid Wien players
First Vienna FC players
Austrian Football Bundesliga players
2. Liga (Austria) players